Stephen Briers is a British clinical psychologist.

Briers was an on-screen expert in BBC Three's Little Angels and Teen Angels, working with Tanya Byron. In 2006, he presented the Channel 4 series, Make Me A Grownup. He also presents The 10 Demandments for Channel Five. Briers has also appeared as an expert psychologist on GMTV. He presented Freaky Eaters with nutritionist Natalie Savona for one series.

He has written a parenting book called Superpowers for parents.

A co-author of the book Teen Angels (2006), based on the BBC Three series, Briers has also written Help your Child to Succeed in Life. He also contributes frequently to the Times Educational Supplement.

His latest book, ''Psychobabble: Exploding the Myths of the Self-help Generation, debunking a wide range of psychobabble, was published in September 2012 through Pearson. The book sets out to "debunk the myths and expose the quack theories of the multi-million-pound self-improvement industry".

References 

British television presenters
British psychologists
British science writers
Living people
Year of birth missing (living people)